Emile Paul Tendeng (born 31 December  1992) is a Senegalese professional footballer who plays as an attacking midfielder for Finnish club Jaro.

Career
The assistant coach of Casa Sport described him as "football car crash, prodigy and player with extraordinary potential", and compared him with Iain Dowie.

In 2013, Tendeng moved to FC Vaslui on loan from Casa Sport for six-months.

In February 2016, Tendeng signed a two-year contract with Finnish club Ilves.

On 30 October 2017, Tendeng signed a one-year contract with SJK, with the option of an additional year.

For the 2021 season, he joined Mariehamn.

On 29 January 2022, he signed with Jaro for the 2022 season.

Honours

Individual
Veikkausliiga Player of the Year: 2016
Veikkausliiga Midfielder of the Year: 2016
Veikkausliiga Team of the Year: 2016

References

External links

1992 births
Living people
Association football forwards
Senegalese footballers
Senegal international footballers
Senegalese expatriate footballers
Veikkausliiga players
Casa Sports players
FC Vaslui players
Seinäjoen Jalkapallokerho players
FC Ilves players
IFK Mariehamn players
FF Jaro players
Liga I players
2011 CAF U-23 Championship players
Expatriate footballers in Romania
Senegalese expatriate sportspeople in Romania
Expatriate footballers in Finland
Senegalese expatriate sportspeople in Finland